The Giuseppe Garibaldi Trophy is a rugby union trophy awarded to the winner of the annual Six Nations Championship match between France and Italy.

The trophy, designed by former French international and professional sculptor Jean-Pierre Rives, was awarded for the first time on 3 February 2007 to France as part of the celebrations of the bicentenary of Giuseppe Garibaldi's birth. As of 2023, the trophy has been contested seventeen times, with France winning fifteen and Italy two.

Giuseppe Garibaldi 

Giuseppe Garibaldi was an Italian revolutionary born in 1807 in Nice (now in France, but then part of the Kingdom of Sardinia). One of the fathers of unified Italy, he was also a general in the French Army during the Franco-Prussian War in 1870.

As part of the celebrations of the bicentenary of Garibaldi's birth it was decided by the Fédération Française de Rugby and the Federazione Italiana Rugby to create a trophy in his honour and have it awarded to the winner of the annual 6 Nations Championship's game between France and Italy.

Trophy

Idea
The original idea of a trophy to be awarded to the winner of annual game between France and Italy, was first mooted in Nice by the International committee for the celebration of the bicentennial of Garibaldi's birth.

Garibaldi was born in 1807 in Nice, when it was part of the Kingdom of Sardinia/Piedmont, before it was annexed to France in 1860; he fought during the unification of Italy and during the Franco-Prussian War for France. Also from a rugby union point of view historically the sport in Italy has been in the past heavily influenced by the French.

The idea was brought to the attention of both the French and Italian rugby federations, quickly gathered momentum and was approved on 6 December 2006 by the International Rugby Board.

Design
Designed by former international and full-time sculptor Jean-Pierre Rives, the trophy was unveiled on 2 February 2007, during a ceremony at the French embassy in Rome. The trophy's godfathers were former international players Diego Dominguez for Italy and Jean-François Tordo (who was born in Nice) for France.

Matches

Results

See also 
 History of rugby union matches between France and Italy
 France national rugby union team
 Italy national rugby union team
 Millennium Trophy
 Calcutta Cup
 France-Italy relations
 Auld Alliance Trophy
 Centenary Quaich

References

External links 
 www.ffr.fr – Fédération Française de Rugby
 www.federugby.it – Federazione Italiana Rugby
 www.6nations.net – 6 Nations official website

Six Nations Championship trophies
2007 establishments in France
2007 establishments in Italy
International rugby union competitions hosted by France
International rugby union competitions hosted by Italy
History of rugby union matches between France and Italy
Giuseppe Garibaldi
Recurring sporting events established in 2007